Trachypetrella is a genus of grasshoppers in the family Pamphagidae. There is one described species in Trachypetrella, T. anderssonii, found in southern Africa.

References

Pamphagidae